Netball at the World Games was played on three occasions between 1985 and 1993. The International Netball Federation remains a member of the International World Games Association

Tournaments

Medalists

1985

1989

1993

References

 
Netball
International netball competitions
Netball at multi-sport events